Visingsö is an island in the southern half of Lake Vättern in Sweden.

According to legend, a giant named Vist created Visingsö by throwing a lump of soil into the lake so that his wife could use it to step over the lake.

History 
In the 12th and 13th century, Näs Castle on the southern end of Visingsö was the residence for the fragile Swedish monarchy. Four Swedish kings died there: Karl Sverkersson, Erik Knutsson, Johan Sverkersson, and Magnus Ladulås.
Furthermore, in the 17th century the influential Brahe family resided in Visingsborg, a castle on the eastern side of the island. Both Näs Castle and Visingsborg are presently in ruins and well known landmarks of Visingsö.

The Swedish Navy planted oak trees on the island beginning in 1831 to provide strategically important timber for future ship construction. Once the timber was ready to harvest it was no longer required for ship construction. The Swedish Navy declined to harvest the trees when offered them in 1975. Consequently, Visingsö is partially covered by oak forests, the rest being farmland.

Climate 
Visingsö has an oceanic climate (Köppen Cfb), influenced by its position in the middle of the deep lake. As a result of Vättern's depth, it struggles both freezing over in winter as the surrounding landmass is colder, while in summer the temperature of the lake remains fairly cool. The relative warmth of Visingsö in summer is a result of Vättern being relatively narrow, resulting in warm air from the landmass only being slightly tempered. Temperatures below  in winter are not very common annually due to the open water moderating the extremes. In spite of the unfavourable conditions for heat in its deep-lake position, Visingsö has warmer summers than all of the island of Ireland as well as much of Great Britain. Even so, the cold surface water enables air frosts to occur as late as May, in extreme instances. Visingsö is very dry for much of the year, although summers can be relatively wet.

Geology 

Visingsö has long been of interest to geologists because of the development of a sedimentary series of rocks (the Visingsö Group) there (and elsewhere around Lake Vättern, especially on the west side). The surrounding rocks are largely much older "Småland granites" of mixed granite-like compositions. The Visingsö Group is approximately 1000 m thick and is divided into three units. It is Late Riphean in date. A wide array of late Precambrian fossils have been recovered from the group, including stromatolites, vase-shaped microfossils, acritarchs and macro fossils such as Tawuia. The sediments of the Visingsö Group have been preserved within the Lake Vättern graben structure.

Transportation
There are two car ferries that travel between Visingsö and Gränna on a continuous basis. There are several roads connecting communities on the island, that are also served by bus. There is also a small airfield on the north end of the island, consisting of two grass runways.

See also
List of islands of Sweden

References

External links 

Visingsö.net
Visingö Airfield

Lake islands of Sweden
Småland
Islands of Jönköping County